Torso of a Young Man is a sculpture created by Constantin Brâncuși between 1917 and 1922. It depicts the male torso as a cylinder mounted on vestigial cylindrical legs, cut off at mid-thigh. Sidney Geist has pointed out that the sculpture, without genitalia, is itself a phallus with testes.   There are several versions. Torso of a Young Man I was carved from a fork in a maple branch wood mounted on a limestone block. It is now in the Brodsky Gallery of the Philadelphia Museum of Art. A similar sculpture, dated 1923 and carved in walnut, is in the Musée National d'Art Moderne, Centre Georges Pompidou, Paris. Brancusi also cast the torso in highly polished bronze. The two examples of this version are held in the Cleveland Museum of Art and the Hirshhorn Museum and Sculpture Garden

References

1910s sculptures
1920s sculptures
Sculptures by Constantin Brâncuși
Bronze sculptures in the United States
Sculptures in France
Sculptures of the Cleveland Museum of Art
Sculptures in the collection of the Philadelphia Museum of Art
Hirshhorn Museum and Sculpture Garden
Sculptures in the collection of the Musée National d'Art Moderne